José Manuel del Río Virgen (born 8 January 1954) is a Mexican politician affiliated with Convergence who currently serves in the lower house of the Mexican Congress.

Born in Córdoba, Veracruz, he studied economy at Instituto Politécnico Nacional.

Political career
Del Río Virgen is a member and founder of Convergence who has occupied different positions in the public service.  In 2000 he was elected to serve as federal deputy during the LVIII Legislature.  In 2004 he was elected municipal president (mayor) of Tecolutla but left that position in 2006 to run for a seat in the Chamber of Deputies of Mexico; he won the election becoming a federal deputy representing Veracruz during the LX Legislature

References

1954 births
Living people
Politicians from Veracruz
Citizens' Movement (Mexico) politicians
Members of the Chamber of Deputies (Mexico)
Municipal presidents in Veracruz
21st-century Mexican politicians
People from Córdoba, Veracruz
Instituto Politécnico Nacional alumni